Ashley Walker (22 June 1844 – 26 May 1927) was an English amateur first-class cricketer, who played nine games for Yorkshire County Cricket Club from 1863 to 1870, ten for Cambridge University from 1864 to 1866, and one match for the North of England in 1870.  He also played for the South Wales Cricket Club from 1875 to 1876. His cousin, Charles Walker, played one first-class match for the Gentlemen of the North.

Born in Bowling Hall, Bradford, Yorkshire, England, Walker was educated at Westminster School and at Trinity College (1862-3) and Magdalene College, Cambridge (1863-6) and was a cricket blue from 1864 to 1866. He was a right-handed batsman, who scored 531 first-class runs at 15.61, with a top score of 65 against the Marylebone Cricket Club (MCC).  He took eighteen wickets with his right arm slow roundarm bowling at 16.05, with his best analysis being 6 for 89 against Surrey.

He also played for Staffordshire but, in 1875, he moved to Swansea, before serving in the public education department in Ceylon from 1876 to 1901. From 1890 to 1894 and then in 1895 and 1901 he was Principal Inspector of Schools, Ceylon. Whilst there he played cricket, especially at the Royal College Colombo and, in 1885 and 1886, Walker captained teams to Madras and Bombay. He also played for the Yorkshire Gentlemen team in its early days.

He married Rachel Strick of Swansea on 28 September 1876. Walker died in May 1927 in Harrold, Bedfordshire, England and was survived by family and friends.

References

External links
Cricinfo Profile
Wisden obituary

1844 births
1927 deaths
People educated at Westminster School, London
Alumni of Trinity College, Cambridge
Alumni of Magdalene College, Cambridge
Yorkshire cricketers
Cambridge University cricketers
Cricketers from Bradford
English cricketers
Faculty of Royal College, Colombo
North v South cricketers
English cricketers of 1826 to 1863
English cricketers of 1864 to 1889